In the 1994 season, the National Lacrosse League (then called the Major Indoor Lacrosse League) began naming a Player of the Week. The first recipient was Buffalo Bandits legend John Tavares.

In 2002, the league renamed the award to Overall Player of the Week, and added weekly awards for Offensive Player of the Week, Defensive Player of the Week, and Rookie of the Week. In 2007, another new award was added, Transition Player of the Week.

Current awards
Players listed in italics are retired. Number of awards is up to and including the 2008 NLL season.

Overall Player of the Week
2002-present

Offensive Player of the Week
2002-present

Defensive Player of the Week
2002-present

Rookie of the Week
2002-present

Transition Player of the Week
2007-present

Previous awards

Player of the Week
1994-2001

See also
 National Lacrosse League Monthly Awards
 List of NLL seasons—contains the winners for each week

References 
 

Weekly